The International Fellowship of Christians and Jews (also referred to as IFCJ or The Fellowship) is a philanthropic organization founded in 1983 by Yechiel Eckstein whose stated mission is to promote understanding and cooperation between Jews and Christians, and provide humanitarian aid for the State of Israel. Since 2019, Yael Eckstein has been serving as The Fellowship's President and CEO.

History
As the national Co-director of Interreligious Affairs for the Anti-Defamation League in Chicago, Eckstein, an Orthodox rabbi, began to forge partnerships with evangelical Christians. In 1983, he established the Holyland Fellowship of Christians and Jews to promote Jewish-Christian cooperation on projects for improving the safety and security of Jews in Israel and around the world. On September 1, 1991, the organization was renamed the International Fellowship of Christians and Jews.

Per Haaretz, by 2012 the Fellowship collected over $100 million annually in donations for Israel, wherein half of the fund was spent in Israel, supporting soup kitchens, absorption centers, and bomb shelters renovation. At the same period of time, a quarter of the fund's donations were allocated for various Jewish aid programs.

In 2003, Eckstein founded the International Fellowship of Christians and Jews of Canada; in 2006, La Fraternidad Internacional de Cristianos y Judíos; in 2012, the International Fellowship of Christians and Jews of Australia; and, also in 2012, a new Fellowship affiliate in South Korea.

In 2014, Eckstein was awarded the American Jewish Joint Distribution Committee’s prestigious Raoul Wallenberg Award. The ceremony was attended by the Israeli Prime Minister Benjamin Netanyahu and JDC's CEO Alan Gill .

James Rudin, a senior inter-religious adviser for the American Jewish Community, described Eckstein as "well-respected within the American Jewish mainstream. Until he came along, evangelicals and Jews were like ships passing in the night."
 
Eckstein died on February 6, 2019. His daughter, Yael Eckstein, succeeded him as president of the Fellowship.
 
In 2020, as the COVID-19 pandemic created more needs for individuals and elderly in Israel, The Fellowship allocated $20 million in emergency funding, on top of its regular programming, under the guidance of Yael Eckstein.
 
In 2022, Yael Eckstein led The Fellowship to establish a $4 million emergency fund for Ukraine. The Fellowship was able to work with partners already on the ground in the former Soviet Union to set up a help hotline and deliver emergency aid to Jewish communities displaced by war. They supplied ongoing basic needs to Ukraine even during the Jewish holiday of Passover.

Organizational structure
The organization has headquarters in Chicago and Jerusalem. It is supervised by an independent board of directors, Jewish and Christian. Yael Eckstein serves as The Fellowship's President & CEO. Among the organization's key people are Robin Van Etten (COO), Jackie Gotwalt (executive director of IFCJ Canada), Youngmi Kim (CEO in Korea) and Bishop Paul Lanier (Chairman of the Board of Directors).
 
The Organization's main areas of assistance include:
Holocaust survivors
Poor elderly
Orphans, children and families
Persecuted and oppressed
IDF soldiers and their families
Victims of terror and war
 
In May 2010, Israel’s Minister of Welfare and Social Services Isaac Herzog presented Eckstein with the government of Israel's first-ever Award for Special Contribution to the Welfare of the People of Israel. The following month, Newsweek named him one of the 50 Most Influential Rabbis in America. Eckstein has received about 50 awards total for his public service work, including the American Jewish Joint Distribution Committee’s prestigious Raoul Wallenberg award in 2014.
 
In 2005, Eckstein was appointed Goodwill Ambassador of the State of Israel, with special emphasis on Israel’s relationships with evangelical communities in Latin America.

Rating
Charity Navigator rated the International Fellowship of Christians and Jews 3 out of 4 stars (score 82.49 of 100) .

Activities and programs
The Fellowship's outreach focuses on five major programs:

 On Wings of Eagles assists Jews in making aliyah (immigration) to Israel from the former Soviet Union, Ethiopia, Europe, Arab lands, and other countries around the world, and helps them with their klitah (resettlement).
 Guardians of Israel provides basic necessities to needy Israelis by supporting hundreds of projects such as soup kitchens, and by providing food, clothing and basic medical assistance to be distributed while addressing long-term needs like housing, family care, and jobs.
 Isaiah 58 provides food packages, hot “meals-on-wheels,” medicine, in-home care, housing, heating fuel, clothing, and other basic essentials to more than 200,000 destitute elderly Soviet Jews, and gives Jewish orphans and vulnerable street children in the former Soviet Union the care they need to survive and prepare for a brighter future.
 Stand for Israel rallies churches, Christian leaders and others to advocate for Israel by praying for it and supporting its right to exist in peace and security. The Fellowship aims to “engage people both spiritually and politically on behalf of Israel and the Jewish people, by encouraging them to "pray for the peace of Jerusalem" and providing them with the facts they need to advocate for the Jewish state and fight anti-Israel bias in the media.”

The organization also supports the Israeli Christian Recruitment Forum, a group led by Gabriel Naddaf, a Greek Orthodox priest from Nazareth, which aims to increase the number of Christian Arabs volunteering to serve in the Israel Defense Forces.
 
Overall, the Fellowship supports over 450 programs across Israel with 5000 volunteers involved. According to The Christian Post, "The Fellowship ... has placed nearly 3,000 bomb shelters in Israel to date.''

Finances
The Fellowship is recognized as a 501(c)(3) not-for-profit organization by the IRS and submits to examination by the Better Business Bureau’s Wise Giving Alliance. The organization shows full compliance with the BBB’s Standards for Charitable Accountability In 2004, The Fellowship was one of the first not-for-profits entitled to display the BBB Charity Seal, showing full compliance with their Standards for Charitable Accountability.
 
In 2019, according to their tax returns the ministry declared $118 million in "contributions and grants". According to independent American charity watchdog Charity Navigator, 75.4% of expenses went towards programs and services it delivers, 10.1% on  Administrative Expenses and 14.3% on Fundraising Expenses.
 
The organization raises around $130 million per year, largely from evangelical Christian sources, and has raised an estimated total of $1.5billion since 1983.

In 2020, according to their tax returns, the organization declared more than $156 million in contributions and grants.”
 
In 2021, The Fellowship raised more than $200 million and helped more than 2 million people by supplying basic needs and assistance to 1 million people, providing security to more than 800,000 people encountering threats of terrorism and anti-Semitism, and helping more than 5,000 Jews return home to Israel.

Controversy
In 2009, six months before his death, the Lithuanian-Haredi Jewish leader Rabbi Yosef Shalom Eliashiv  issued a ruling banning Haredi Jews from taking funds from the Fellowship, citing worries of Christian missionary activity and idol worship. In response to the ruling, Eckstein said he would "expose his organization's list of Haredi-religious beneficiaries in order "to make sure everything is transparent."
 
The Fellowship's interfaith work has generated criticism from some in the Jewish community. In 2001, Rabbi Avraham Shapira, an Orthodox Jew and Religious Zionist, issued a ruling against accepting funds from the Fellowship. In 2002 the Edah HaChareidis Haredi Jewish rabbinical court issued a ruling against accepting funds from the Fellowship, and, in 2007, the new Chief Rabbi of the said Edah HaChareidis, Yitzchok Tuvia Weiss added his signature.

In 2023, The Washington Post reported that Eliminalia, a reputation management company had been hired to remove salary and other information from online sources critical of the charity. Eliminalia sent what the Washington Post called "fraudulent copyright-infringement complaints" to WordPress in an attempt to remove posts critical of the $4 million combined compensation paid by IFCJ to Yechiel and Yael Eckstein in 2019, which an IFCJ spokesperson said was due to a death benefit paid out to Rabbi Eckstein's widow.

See also
 American Jewish Committee
 Eliminalia - removed critical stories for IFCJ
 International Council of Christians and Jews, an unrelated group also engaged in Christian-Jewish dialogue
 John Paul II Center for Interreligious Dialogue
 Pontifical Council for Interreligious Dialogue
 Project Interchange
 Zionism

References

External links
 

Christian and Jewish interfaith dialogue
Christian Zionism
Jewish interfaith organizations
Religious organizations established in 1983
Zionist organizations
1983 establishments in Illinois